Mściszewo  is a village in the administrative district of Gmina Murowana Goślina, within Poznań County, Greater Poland Voivodeship, in west-central Poland. The village has a population of 292.

Mściszewo is spread over quite an extensive area. It includes farms, a sand quarry, and both modern and older residential areas. The village has a volunteer fire brigade, and formerly had a school (1917–1976). Its first mention in written records dates from 1388. The village formerly belonged to the Cistercian convent at Owińska.

It is close to the Warta river, and includes the area of the former village of Goślinka or Mała Goślina ("Little Goślina"), a little south of the point where the Trojanka (or Goślinka) stream joins the Warta. South of this, along the road leading to Promnice, is the settlement of Złotoryjsko.

Notes

References
Local authority website
Murowana Goślina i okolice, N. Kulse, Z. Wojczak (local publication)

Villages in Poznań County